Mtutura Abdallah Mtutura (born 6 May 1961) is a Tanzanian CCM politician and Member of Parliament for Tunduru South constituency since 2005.

References

1961 births
Living people
Chama Cha Mapinduzi MPs
Tanzanian MPs 2005–2010
Tanzanian MPs 2010–2015
Ndanda Secondary School alumni
Minaki Secondary School alumni
College of Business Education alumni